The K platform series are platforms developed by Hyundai and Kia for its range of automobiles since 2017.

K1 platform 
The K1 platform is utilized for entry subcompact models (A-segment). It was introduced in 2018 coinciding with the launch of the second generation Hyundai Santro, replacing the SA platform and BA platform. It is a modified version of the SA platform, and Hyundai claimed the K1 platform is 63 percent more rigid than its predecessor.

Vehicles using platform (calendar years):

Hyundai Santro/Atos/Eon (AH2) (2018–2022)
Hyundai Grand i10 Nios (AI3) (2019–present)
Hyundai Aura/Grand i10 sedan (AI3) (2020–present)
Hyundai Casper (AX1) (2021–present)

K2 platform 
Introduced in 2016, the K2 platform is mainly utilized for B-segment and small C-segment vehicles. The platform is able to support models with three-row seating. It is derived from the PB platform and GB platform, while also replacing them.

Vehicles using platform (calendar years):

 Hyundai i20 (BC3/BI3) (2020–present)
 Hyundai Accent/Verna/Solaris (HC/YC) (2017–present)
 Kia Rio/K2/KX Cross (FB) (2017–present)
 Hyundai i30 (PD) (2016–present)
 Kia Ceed/ProCeed/XCeed (CD) (2018–present)
 Hyundai Venue (QX) (2019–present)
 Kia Sonet (QY) (2020–present)
 Hyundai Bayon (BC3 CUV) (2021–present)
 Hyundai Creta/ix25 (SU2) (2019–present)
 Hyundai Alcazar (SU2 LWB) (2021–present)
 Kia Seltos/KX3 (SP2i/SP2c) (2019–present)
 Hyundai Stargazer (KS) (2022–present)
 Kia Carens (KY) (2022–present)

K3 platform 
Introduced in 2020, the K3 platform is an all-new platform for C-segment vehicles as the successor to J platform series. Dubbed as the third-generation platform, Hyundai claimed the platform allowed engineers to lower the center of gravity for more agile handling. The platform also improves safety due to the usage of a multiload path structure.

 Hyundai Elantra/Avante/i30 sedan (CN7) (2020–present)
 Kia Niro (SG2) (2021–present)
 Hyundai Kona (SX2) (2022–present)

References 

K platforms